The Symmetric Rank 1 (SR1) method is a quasi-Newton method to update the second derivative (Hessian)
based on the derivatives (gradients) calculated at two points. It is a generalization to the secant method for a multidimensional problem.
This update maintains the symmetry of the matrix but does not guarantee that the update be positive definite.

The sequence of Hessian approximations generated by the SR1 method converges to the true Hessian under mild conditions, in theory; in practice, the approximate Hessians generated by the SR1 method show faster progress towards the true Hessian than do popular alternatives (BFGS or DFP), in preliminary numerical experiments. The SR1 method has computational advantages for sparse or partially separable problems.

;
its gradient has a Taylor-series approximation also
,
which is used to update .  The above secant-equation need not have a unique solution  .
The SR1 formula computes (via an update of rank 1) the symmetric solution that is closest to the current approximate-value  :
,
where
.
The corresponding update to the approximate inverse-Hessian  is
.

One might wonder why positive-definiteness is not preserved — after all, a rank-1 update of the form  is positive-definite if  is. The explanation is that the update might be of the form  instead because the denominator can be negative, and in that case there are no guarantees about positive-definiteness.

The SR1 formula has been rediscovered a number of times. A drawback is that the denominator can vanish. Some authors have suggested that the update be applied only if
,
where  is a small number, e.g. .

See also
 Quasi-Newton method
 Broyden's method
 Newton's method in optimization
 Broyden-Fletcher-Goldfarb-Shanno (BFGS) method
 L-BFGS method

References

Quasi-Newton methods